In orthography, a plene scriptum (Latin , "fully" and scriptum, plural scripta, "[something] written") is a word containing an additional letter, usually one which is superfluous, not normally written in such words, nor needed for the proper comprehension of the word.  Today, the term applies mostly to sacred scripture. Examples of plene scripta appear frequently in classical Hebrew texts, and copyists are obliged to copy them unchanged, to ensure that biblical or other sacred texts are written with universal conformity.  The expression plene scriptum ( yater, "excess"), sometimes simply described in Hebrew as מלא (malé, "full"), is often used in contrast with defective scriptum ( ḥaser, deficient), the latter implying a word in which a letter that is normally present has been omitted.  Together, plene and defective scripta are sometimes described using the Hebrew phrase "yeter vehaser".

Implications
In the Hebrew Bible, in Devarim 3:21, the name "Joshua" is written in Hebrew in plene scriptum ( yhwšw’), as it possesses a superfluous vav, and which word is normally written with only one vav, as in יהושע (yhwš’). Other examples abound of this anomaly, such as the name "Jacob" ( y’qwb) in Leviticus 26:42. The Hebrew name "Issachar" (יִשָּׂשכָר), where there is a second letter sin (ש) having no sound, is a classic example of plene scriptum. The word צידה in Genesis 27:3, where the he at the end of the word has no function, is another example of plene scriptum or else a case of qere and ketiv.

The Babylonian Talmud discusses why the Hebrew Bible in  writes for the plural word "booths" the Hebrew word סֻּכֹּת (in defective scriptum), but in the verse that immediately follows makes use of the plural word in its usual form, סֻּכּוֹת. A biblical word's plene or defective characteristic has often been used in rabbinic hermeneutics to decide Halachic norms. The Talmud and the rabbis explain the variations in plene and defective scriptum found in the Torah as being merely a Halacha le-Moshe mi-Sinai (a Law given to Moses at Sinai).

In the Semitic languages (Hebrew, Aramaic and Arabic), paleographers often describe the addition of a plene consonantal letter, such as vav and yud (used in place of the vowels "o", "u", "i", and "ei"), as employing matres lectionis in its reading, although not all plene letters used in Hebrew words are indeed a mater lectionis.

Variant readings
The ethnographer, Jacob Saphir (1822–1886), in his 19th-century work Iben Safir, mentions the tradition of orthography found in the Halleli Codex of the Pentateuch, in which he laid down the most outstanding examples of plene and defective scriptum copied generation after generation by the scribes. The Catalan rabbi and Talmudist, Menachem Meiri (1249 – c. 1310), also brings down an exhaustive list of words in his Kiryat Sefer, showing which words are to be written by scribes in plene scriptum and which words are to be written in defective scriptum, based on the Masoretic Text. Rabbi Jedidiah Norzi (1560–1626) wrote a popular work on Hebrew orthography contained in the Five Books of Moses, and in the five Megillot, with examples of plene and defective writings, which was later named Minḥat Shai.

In the Tikkun Soferim (the model text for copying Torah scrolls by scribes), the word plene is always used in relation to other words written in defective scriptum, not because there is necessarily anything unusual or abnormal about the word being written in such a way, but to ensure a universal layout (conformity) in scribal practices, where one word in a text must be written as though it were lacking in matres lectionis, and another word in a different text (sometimes even the same word) appearing as though it was not.

Among Israel's diverse ethnic groups, variant readings have developed over certain words in the Torah, the Sephardic tradition calls for the word ויהיו (wyhyw) in the verse ויהיו כל ימי נח to be written in defective scriptum (i.e. ויהי wyhy), but the Yemenite Jewish community requiring it to be written in plene scriptum (i.e. ויהיו). The word mineso in גדול עוני מנשוא is written in Sephardic Torah scrolls in plene scriptum, with an additional "waw", but in Yemenite Torah scrolls, the same word mineso is written in defective scriptum, without a "waw" (i.e. מנשא mnšʾ).

Other usage
The word plene has also come to denote the horizontal bar or line written above the six double-sounding consonants in ancient Hebrew codices, whenever their assigned reading is to be read without a dagesh, or as a non-accentuated Hebrew character. These letters are the bet, gimel, dalet, kaph, pe, and tau. When the accentuation dot appears in the middle of these Hebrew characters, there is no plene bar written above them.

In ancient Roman usage, the phrase plene scriptum may have simply referred to Latin characters written without abbreviation.

See also 
 Mater lectionis
 Hebrew spelling
 
 Parashah
 Qere and Ketiv
 Ktiv hasar niqqud

References

External links
 Vatican Library Heb. Ms. 448, 11th–12th century Sephardic Torah scroll, showing in its folios the plene bar written above six of the double-sounding consonants (בג"ד כפ"ת) whenever they are to be read without a dagesh.

Rhetoric
Hebrew alphabet
Semitic writing systems
Jewish scribes (soferim)
Orthography
Language of the Hebrew Bible